Ireland competed at the 2016 Summer Olympics in Rio de Janeiro, Brazil, from 5 to 21 August 2016. This was the nation's twenty-first appearance at the Summer Olympics, having attended every edition, either in its own right or as part of a Great Britain and Ireland team before 1924, with the exception of the 1936 Summer Olympics in Germany.

The Olympic Council of Ireland fielded a team of 77 athletes, 51 men and 26 women, across 14 sports at the Games. It was the nation's largest delegation sent to the Olympics since 1996, due to the historic comeback of the men's field hockey squad after a century-long absence. Apart from field hockey, Ireland also made its Olympic return to diving after nearly seven decades, as well as its debut in golf (new to the 2016 Games) and women's track cycling.

The Irish roster featured four Olympic medalists from London 2012, namely defending boxing champion Katie Taylor in the women's flyweight division, boxers Michael Conlan and Paddy Barnes (bronze in 2008 and 2012), who was selected as the nation's flag bearer in the opening ceremony, and race walking veteran Robert Heffernan, who became the first Irishman in history to participate in five Olympics. Kevin Kilty was named as Team Ireland Chef de Mission for the Games.

Ireland returned home from Rio de Janeiro with two silver medals. Brothers Gary and Paul O'Donovan etched their names on Irish sporting history by winning the country's first ever medal in rowing, and instantly became internet sensations after several videos of them being interviewed went viral. Meanwhile, Laser Radial sailor Annalise Murphy banished her pain of missing out the podium at London 2012 with a silver-medal effort in the Laser Radial class, ending Ireland's 36-year-old drought on the sport. For the first time in 12 years, Ireland failed to collect a single medal in boxing, as none of its boxers progressed beyond the quarterfinal round.

Ticket scandal

On 5 August police in Rio arrested two people for attempted illegal resale of hundreds of tickets allocated to the Olympic Council of Ireland (OCI). One of the two was employed by THG Sports, which was the OCI's authorised ticket reseller (ATR) in 2012 but not 2016; the OCI denied any involvement. Shane Ross, the Minister of State at the, promised a "robust inquiry". Pro 10 Sports Management, the OCI's 2016 ATR, said the man arrested was working as their agent to distribute tickets which had been paid for legitimately. On 17 August, Pat Hickey, the OCI president, was arrested in Rio in connection with the investigation.

Medallists

Athletics

Irish athletes achieved qualifying standards in the following athletics events (up to a maximum of 3 athletes in each event):

Following the end of the qualifying period on July 11, 2016, a total of 17 athletes (8 men and 9 women) were officially named to the Irish track and field roster, with race walker and London 2012 bronze medalist Robert Heffernan becoming the first Irishman in history to be selected for five consecutive Olympics.

Track & road events
Men

Women

Field events

Badminton

Ireland qualified two badminton players for each of the following events into the Olympic tournament. Two-time Olympian Scott Evans was selected among the top 34 individual shuttlers in the men's singles based on the BWF World Rankings as of 5 May 2016, while Chloe Magee picked up one of the spare athlete berths from the doubles as the next highest-ranked eligible player in the women's singles.

Boxing

Ireland entered eight boxers to compete in the following weight classes into the Olympic boxing tournament. 2012 Olympic bronze medalist Paddy Barnes and Michael Conlan were the only Irishmen finishing among the top two of their respective division in the World Series of Boxing, and qualified from that method. Conlan and Joe Ward earned spots at the 2015 World Championships. Conlan's results in the World Championships took preference, allowing others to qualify through the WSB. Steven Donnelly had initially finished outside the qualifying places in the WSB, but eventually received the unused spot, following a box-off between both Russian qualifiers (through WSB and World Championships).

Brendan Irvine and David Joyce booked Olympic spots with box-off victories at the 2016 European Qualification Tournament in Samsun, Turkey. Meanwhile, London 2012 lightweight champion Katie Taylor had her sights set to her Olympic title defense in Rio with a quarterfinal victory at the World Championships in Astana, Kazakhstan. Michael O'Reilly secured an additional Olympic place on the Irish roster at the 2016 AIBA World Qualifying Tournament in Baku, Azerbaijan.

Longtime head coach Billy Walsh left the Irish Amateur Boxing Association for USA Boxing in October 2015 after a contract dispute; this was mooted as a factor in the team's disappointing results.

Men

Women

Cycling

Road
Irish riders qualified for a maximum of two quota places in the men's Olympic road race by virtue of their top 15 final national ranking in the 2015 UCI Europe Tour.

Track
Following the completion of the 2016 UCI Track Cycling World Championships, Ireland entered one rider to compete only in women's keirin at the Olympics, by virtue of her final individual UCI Olympic ranking in that event.

Keirin

Diving

For the first time since the 1948 Summer Olympics, Ireland entered one diver into the Olympic competition by virtue of a top 18 finish at the 2016 FINA World Cup.

Equestrian

Ireland fielded a full squad of riders in the eventing competition by finishing sixth in the team event at the 2014 FEI World Equestrian Games. One dressage and jumping rider were each added to the squad by virtue of the following results in the individual FEI Olympic rankings: a top six placement outside the continental selection in dressage, and a top finish from North Western Europe in jumping.

Dressage
Judy Reynolds and Vancouver K were named to the Irish roster on June 10, 2016.

Eventing
The Irish eventing team was named to the Olympic equestrian roster on June 9, 2016.

"#" indicates that the score of this rider does not count in the team competition, since only the best three results of a team are counted.

Jumping
Greg Broderick and Going Global were named to the Irish roster on June 8, 2016.

Field hockey

Ireland qualified for the Olympics after finishing fifth in the 2014–15 Men's FIH Hockey World League Semifinals. Australia's 3–2 victory over New Zealand in the 2015 Oceania Cup confirmed Ireland's qualification. It was the first time Ireland played in an Olympic field hockey tournament since 1908.

Summary

Team roster

Group play

Golf

Ireland entered four golfers (two per gender) into the Olympic tournament. Pádraig Harrington (world no. 148), Séamus Power (world no. 290), and Leona Maguire (world no. 353) qualified directly among the top 60 eligible players for their respective individual events based on the IGF World Rankings as of 11 July 2016. Meanwhile, Stephanie Meadow received a spare Olympic berth freed up by the Dutch golfers, as second replacement, to join Maguire in the women's tournament. Paul McGinley is the non-playing team leader.

Harrington and Power were confirmed for selection on 14 July, three weeks after the withdrawal in quick succession of Rory McIlroy, Shane Lowry, and Graeme McDowell (world ranked 4, 25, and 57 respectively). McIlroy and Lowry blamed the Zika epidemic while McDowell stated he wanted to be with his pregnant wife. McIlroy and McDowell are from Northern Ireland and there had been speculation in previous years about whether they would choose to represent Ireland or Great Britain, McDowell deciding in 2013 and McIlroy in 2014.

Gymnastics

Artistic
Ireland entered two artistic gymnasts into the Olympic competition, including a first female Irish gymnast. London 2012 Olympian Kieran Behan and Ellis O'Reilly had claimed their Olympic spots each in the men's and women's apparatus and all-around events, respectively, at the Olympic Test Event in Rio de Janeiro.

Men

Women

Modern pentathlon

Ireland qualified two modern pentathletes for the following events at the Games. London 2012 Olympian Arthur Lanigan-O'Keeffe claimed one of the eight available Olympic slots with a first-place finish in the men's event at the 2015 European Championships. Meanwhile, O'Keeffe's teammate Natalya Coyle was granted an invitation from UIPM to compete in the women's event for the second time, as one of the next highest-ranked eligible modern pentathletes, not yet qualified, in the same tournament.

Rowing

Ireland qualified three boats for each of the following rowing classes into the Olympic regatta. Rowing crews in both the men's and women's lightweight double sculls confirmed Olympic places for their boats at the 2015 FISA World Championships in Lac d'Aiguebelette, France, while a women's single sculls rower added one more boat to the Irish roster as a result of her top three finish at the 2016 European & Final Qualification Regatta in Lucerne, Switzerland.

Qualification Legend: FA=Final A (medal); FB=Final B (non-medal); FC=Final C (non-medal); FD=Final D (non-medal); FE=Final E (non-medal); FF=Final F (non-medal); SA/B=Semifinals A/B; SC/D=Semifinals C/D; SE/F=Semifinals E/F; QF=Quarterfinals; R=Repechage

Sailing

Irish sailors qualified one boat in each of the following classes through the 2014 ISAF Sailing World Championships, the individual fleet Worlds, and European qualifying regattas. Meanwhile, the 49erFX crew claimed an Olympic place on the Irish sailing team by picking up the unused berth freed by the African continental selection based on the results at the 2015 World Championships.

M = Medal race; EL = Eliminated – did not advance into the medal race; strikethrough – each sailor/team discards their worst result

Swimming

Irish swimmers achieved qualifying standards in the following events (up to a maximum of 2 swimmers in each event at the Olympic Qualifying Time (OQT), and potentially 1 at the Olympic Selection Time (OST)):

Triathlon

Ireland qualified two triathletes for the following events at the Olympics. Bryan Keane and London 2012 Olympian Aileen Morrison were ranked among the top 40 eligible triathletes each in the men's and women's event, respectively, based on the ITU Olympic Qualification List as of May 15, 2016.

See also
Ireland at the 2016 Summer Paralympics

References

External links 

 

Olympics
2016
Nations at the 2016 Summer Olympics